The 1998 ATP Super 9 (also known as Mercedes-Benz Super 9 for sponsorship reasons) were part of the 1998 ATP Tour, the elite tour for professional men's tennis organised by the Association of Tennis Professionals.

Results

Champions

Singles

See also 
 ATP Tour Masters 1000
 1998 ATP Tour
 1998 WTA Tier I Series
 1998 WTA Tour

External links 
 Association of Tennis Professionals (ATP) official website

Atp Super 9, 1998
ATP Tour Masters 1000